Nagendra Singh (born 2 March 1943) is a member of the Bharatiya Janata Party and has won the 2014 Indian general elections from the Khajuraho (Lok Sabha constituency). He was previously a minister in the Government of Madhya Pradesh before becoming Member of Parliament.

Early life and education
Nagendra Singh was born into the erstwhile royal family of Nagod State, India, as the son of Maharaja Mahendra Singh and Maharani Shyam Kumari. Singh married Tara Rajya Luxmi and has two sons. Singh has taken degree of Bachelor of Commerce from Allahabad University.

Career
Singh has won several elections. He fought election from Nagod (Vidhan Sabha constituency) and won then became the cabinet minister of Madhya Pradesh Government in the ministry of Shivraj Singh Chouhan. Singh was elected as a Member of Legislative Assembly of Madhya Pradesh.

Position and responsibility
 1977 - 1985 : Member of the Legislative Assembly, Madhya Pradesh
 2005 - 2007 : Minister of State, Govt. of Madhya Pradesh
 2003 - 2008 : Member of the Legislative Assembly, Madhya Pradesh
 2008 - 2013 : Minister, Govt. of Madhya Pradesh
 May 2014 : Member of the Legislative Assembly, Madhya Pradesh
 1 Sep. 2014 onwards : Elected to 16th Lok Sabha
 15 Sep. 2014 onwards : Member, Standing Committee on Science & Technology, Environment & Forests 
 March. 2015 onwards : Member of water Conservation Committee
 MLA from Nagod 2018-2023

Social activity
Singh promoted cultural activity in the form of "Nagod Mahotsav". Preservation of Wild Life, Forest and Environment.

References

 

1943 births
Living people
India MPs 2014–2019
Bharatiya Janata Party politicians from Madhya Pradesh
Leaders of the Lok Sabha
Lok Sabha members from Madhya Pradesh
Madhya Pradesh MLAs 2003–2008
Madhya Pradesh MLAs 2008–2013
People from Khajuraho
People from Satna district
Madhya Pradesh MLAs 2018–2023